Marie-Thérèse Charlotte (19 December 1778 – 19 October 1851) was the eldest child of King Louis XVI and Queen Marie Antoinette of France. In 1799 she married her cousin Louis Antoine, Duke of Angoulême, the eldest son of Charles, Count of Artois, henceforth becoming the Duchess of Angoulême. She was briefly disputed Queen of France in 1830. Marie-Thérése was the only child of her parents to reach adulthood.

She became Dauphine of France upon the accession of her uncle and father-in-law, Charles X, to the French throne in 1824. Technically she was queen for twenty minutes, on 2 August 1830, between the time her father-in-law signed the instrument of abdication and the time her husband, reluctantly, signed the same document.

Early life (1778–1789)

Marie-Thérèse Charlotte was born at the Palace of Versailles on 19 December 1778, the first child (after eight years of her parents' marriage) and eldest daughter of King Louis XVI and Queen Marie Antoinette. As the daughter of the King of France, she was a fille de France, and as the eldest daughter of the king, she was styled Madame Royale at birth.

Marie Antoinette almost died of suffocation during the birth process due to a crowded and unventilated room, but the windows were finally opened to let fresh air in the room in an attempt to revive her. As a result of the horrible experience, Louis XVI banned public viewing, allowing only close family members and a handful of trusted courtiers to witness the birth of the next royal children. When she was revived, the queen greeted her daughter (whom she later nicknamed Mousseline) with delight:

Marie-Thérèse was baptised on the day of her birth. She was named after her maternal grandmother, the reigning Empress Maria Theresa of Austria. Her second name, Charlotte, was for her mother's favourite sister, Maria Carolina of Austria, Queen consort of Naples and Sicily, whom was known as Charlotte in the family.

Marie-Thérèse's household was headed by her governess, Princess Victoire of Rohan-Guéméné, who later had to resign due to her husband's bankruptcy and was replaced by one of the queen's closest friends, Yolande de Polastron, Duchesse de Polignac. The actual care was, however, given by the sub governesses, notably Baroness Marie Angélique de Mackau. Louis XVI was an affectionate father, who delighted in spoiling his daughter, while her mother was stricter.

Marie Antoinette was determined that her daughter should not grow up to be as haughty as her husband's unmarried aunts. She often invited children of lower rank to come and dine with Marie-Thérèse and, according to some accounts, encouraged the child to give her toys to the poor. In contrast to her image as a materialistic queen who ignored the plight of the poor, Marie Antoinette attempted to teach her daughter about the sufferings of others. One account, written by a partisan source some years after her death, says that on New Year's Day in 1784, after having some beautiful toys brought to Marie-Thérèse's apartment, Marie Antoinette told her:

Marie-Thérèse was joined by two brothers and a sister, Louis Joseph Xavier François, Dauphin of France, in 1781, Louis-Charles de France, Duke of Normandy, in 1785, and Sophie Hélène Béatrix, Madame Sophie, in 1786. Out of all her siblings, she was closest to Louis Joseph, and after his death, Louis Charles. As a young girl, Marie-Thérèse was noted to be quite attractive, with beautiful blue eyes, inheriting the good looks of her mother and maternal grandmother. She was the only one of her parents' four children to survive past age 10.

Life during the Revolution (1789–1795)
As Marie-Thérèse matured, the march toward the French Revolution was gaining momentum. Social discontent mixed with a crippling budget deficit provoked an outburst of anti-absolutist sentiment. By 1789, France was hurtling toward revolution as the result of bankruptcy brought on by the country's support of the American Revolution and high food prices due to drought, all of which was exacerbated by propagandists whose central object of scorn and ridicule was the Queen of France, Marie Antoinette.

As the attacks upon the queen grew ever more vicious, the popularity of the monarchy plummeted. Inside the court at Versailles, jealousies and xenophobia were the principal causes of resentment and anger toward Marie Antoinette. Her unpopularity with certain powerful members of the court, including the Duke of Orléans, led to the printing and distribution of scurrilous pamphlets which accused her of a range of sexual depravities as well as of spending the country into financial ruin. While it is now generally agreed that the queen's actions did little to provoke such animosity, the damage these pamphlets inflicted upon the monarchy proved to be a catalyst for the upheaval to come.

The worsening political situation, however, had little effect on Marie-Thérèse, as more immediate tragedies struck when her younger sister, Sophie, died in 1787, followed two years later by the dauphin, Louis Joseph, who died of tuberculosis, on 4 June 1789, one day after the opening of the Estates-General.

Move to the Tuileries
When the Bastille was stormed by an armed mob on 14 July 1789, the situation reached a climax. The life of the 10-year-old Madame Royale began to be affected as several members of the royal household were sent abroad for their own safety. The Comte d'Artois, her uncle, and the Duchesse de Polignac, governess to the royal children, emigrated on the orders of Louis XVI.

The Duchesse de Polignac was replaced by Princess Louise-Elisabeth de Croÿ, Marquise de Tourzel, whose daughter Pauline became a lifelong friend of Marie-Thérèse.

On 5 October, a mixed cortège of mainly working women from Paris marched to Versailles, intent on acquiring food believed to be stored there, and to advance political demands. After the invasion of the palace in the early hours of 6 October had forced the family to take refuge in the king's apartment, the crowd demanded and obtained the move of the king and his family to the Tuileries Palace in Paris.

As the political situation deteriorated, Louis XVI and Marie Antoinette realized that their lives were in danger, and went along with the plan of escape organised with the help of Count Axel von Fersen. The plan was for the royal family to flee to the northeastern fortress of Montmédy, a royalist stronghold, but the attempted flight was intercepted in Varennes, and the family was escorted back to Paris.

Temple
On 10 August 1792, after the royal family had taken refuge in the Legislative Assembly, Louis XVI was deposed, although the monarchy was not abolished before 21 September. On 13 August, the entire family was imprisoned in the Temple Tower, remains of a former medieval fortress. On 21 January 1793, Louis XVI was executed on the guillotine, at which time Marie-Thérèse's young brother Louis Charles was recognized as King Louis XVII of France by the royalists.

Almost six months later, in the evening of 3 July 1793, guards entered the royal family's apartment, forcibly took away the eight-year-old Louis Charles, and entrusted him to the care of Antoine Simon, a cobbler and Temple commissioner. Remaining in their apartment in the Tower were Marie Antoinette, Marie-Thérèse and Madame Élisabeth, Louis XVI's youngest sister. When Marie Antoinette was taken to the Conciergerie one month later, in the night of 2 August, Marie-Thérèse was left in the care of her aunt Élisabeth who, in turn, was taken away on 9 May 1794 and executed the following day. Of the royal prisoners in the Temple, Marie-Thérèse Charlotte was the only one to survive the Reign of Terror.

Her stay in the Temple Tower was one of solitude and often great boredom. The two books she had, the famous prayer book by the name of The Imitation of Christ and Voyages by Jean-François de la Harpe, were read over and over, so much so that she grew tired of them. But her appeal for more books was denied by government officials, and many other requests were frequently refused, while she often had to endure listening to her brother's cries and screams whenever he was beaten. On 11 May, Robespierre visited Marie-Thérèse, but there is no record of the conversation. During her imprisonment, Marie-Thérèse was never told what had happened to her family. All she knew was that her father was dead. The following words were scratched on the wall of her room in the tower:

{{blockquote|"Marie-Thérèse Charlotte is the most unhappy person in the world. She can obtain no news of her mother; nor be reunited to her, though she has asked it a thousand times. Live, my good mother! whom I love well, but of whom I can hear no tidings. O my father! watch over me from Heaven above. O my God! forgive those who have made my parents suffer."
Marie-Thérèse-Charlotte est la plus malheureuse personne du monde. Elle ne peut obtenir de savoir des nouvelles de sa mère, pas même d'être réunie à elle quoiqu'elle l'ait demandé mille fois. Vive ma bonne mère que j'aime bien et dont je ne peux savoir des nouvelles. Ô mon père, veillez sur moi du haut du Ciel. Ô mon Dieu, pardonnez à ceux qui ont fait souffrir mes parents.|sign=|source=}}

In late August 1795, Marie-Thérèse was finally told what had happened to her family, by Madame Renée de Chanterenne, her female companion. When she had been informed of each of their fates, the distraught Marie-Thérèse began to cry, letting out loud sobs of anguish and grief.

It was only once the Terror was over that Marie-Thérèse was allowed to leave France. She was liberated on 18 December 1795, on the eve of her seventeenth birthday, exchanged for prominent French prisoners (Pierre Riel de Beurnonville, Jean-Baptiste Drouet, Hugues-Bernard Maret, Armand-Gaston Camus, Nicolas Marie Quinette, and Charles-Louis Huguet de Sémonville) and taken to Vienna, the capital city of her cousin, the Holy Roman Emperor Francis II, and also her mother's birthplace.

Exile (1795–1814)

Marie-Thérèse arrived in Vienna on 9 January 1796, in the evening, twenty-two days after she had left the Temple.

She later left Vienna and moved to Mitau, Courland (now Jelgava, Latvia), where her father's eldest surviving brother, the Comte de Provence, lived as a guest of Tsar Paul I of Russia. He had proclaimed himself King of France as Louis XVIII after the death of Marie-Thérèse's brother. With no children of his own, he wished his niece to marry her cousin, Louis-Antoine, Duc d'Angoulême, son of his brother, the Comte d'Artois. Marie-Thérèse agreed.

Louis-Antoine was a shy, stammering young man. His father tried to persuade Louis XVIII against the marriage. However, the wedding took place on 10 June 1799 at Jelgava Palace (modern-day Latvia). The couple had no children.

Life in Britain
The royal family moved to Great Britain, where they settled at Hartwell House, Buckinghamshire, while her father-in-law spent most of his time in Edinburgh, where he had been given apartments at Holyrood House.

The long years of exile ended with the abdication of Napoleon I in 1814, and the first Bourbon Restoration, when Louis XVIII stepped upon the throne of France, twenty-one years after the death of his brother Louis XVI.

Bourbon Restoration (1814–1830)
Louis XVIII attempted to steer a middle course between liberals and the Ultra-royalists led by the Comte d'Artois. He also attempted to suppress the many men who claimed to be Marie-Thérèse's long-lost younger brother, Louis XVII. Those claimants caused the princess a good deal of distress.

Marie-Thérèse found her return emotionally draining and she was distrustful of the many Frenchmen who had supported either the Republic or Napoleon. She visited the site where her brother had died, and the Madeleine Cemetery where her parents were buried. The royal remains were exhumed on 18 January 1815 and re-interred in Saint-Denis Basilica, the royal necropolis of France, on 21 January 1815, the 22nd anniversary of Louis XVI's execution.

In March 1815, Napoleon returned to France and rapidly began to gain supporters and raised an army in the period known as the Hundred Days. Louis XVIII fled France, but Marie-Thérèse, who was in Bordeaux at the time, attempted to rally the local troops. The troops agreed to defend her but not to cause a civil war with Napoleon’s troops. Marie-Thérèse stayed in Bordeaux despite Napoleon’s orders for her to be arrested when his army arrived. Believing her cause was lost, and to spare Bordeaux senseless destruction, she finally agreed to leave. Her actions caused Napoleon to remark that she was "the only man in her family."

After Napoleon was defeated at Waterloo on 18 June 1815, the House of Bourbon was restored for a second time, and Louis XVIII returned to France.

On 13 February 1820, tragedy struck when the Comte d'Artois' younger son, the Duc de Berry, was assassinated by the anti-Bourbon and Bonapartist sympathiser Pierre Louvel, a saddler. Soon after, the royal family was cheered when it was learned that the Duchesse de Berry was pregnant at the time of her husband's death. On 29 September 1820, she gave birth to a son, Henri, Duc de Bordeaux, the so-called "Miracle child", who later, as the Bourbon pretender to the French throne, assumed the title of Comte de Chambord.

Madame la Dauphine
Louis XVIII died on 16 September 1824, and was succeeded by his younger brother, the Comte d'Artois, as Charles X. Marie-Thérèse's husband was now heir to the throne, and she was addressed as Madame la Dauphine. She is the only Dauphine whose father was a former King of France. However, anti-monarchist feeling was on the rise again. Charles's ultra-royalist sympathies alienated many members of the working and middle classes.

On 2 August 1830, after Les Trois Glorieuses, the Revolution of July 1830 which lasted three days, Charles X, who with his family had gone to the Château de Rambouillet, abdicated in favor of his son, who in turn abdicated in favor of his nephew, the nine-year old Duc de Bordeaux. However, in spite of the fact that Charles X had asked him to be regent for the young king, Louis-Philippe, Duc d'Orléans accepted the crown when the Chambre des Députés named him King of the French.

On 4 August, in a long cortège, Marie-Thérèse left Rambouillet for a new exile with her uncle, her husband, her young nephew, as well as his mother, the Duchesse de Berry, and his sister Louise Marie Thérèse d'Artois. On 16 August, the family had reached the port of Cherbourg where they boarded a ship for Britain. King Louis-Philippe had taken care of the arrangements for the departure and sailing of his cousins.

Final exile (1830–1848)

The royal family lived in what is now 22 (then 21) Regent Terrace in EdinburghNewspaper article on sale of 21 Regent Terrace Diggines, Graham "For sale: tragic royals bolthole", The Scotsman, 9 February 2002 Accessed 9 August 2009 until 1833 when the former king chose to move to Prague as a guest of Marie-Thérèse's cousin, Emperor Francis I of Austria. They moved into luxurious apartments in Prague Castle. Later, the royal family left Prague and moved to the estate of Count Coronini near Gorizia, which was then Austrian but is in Italy today. Marie-Thérèse devotedly nursed her uncle through his last illness in 1836, when he died of cholera.

Her husband died in 1844 and was buried next to his father. Marie-Thérèse then moved to Schloss Frohsdorf, a baroque castle just outside Vienna, where she spent her days taking walks, reading, sewing and praying. Her nephew, who now styled himself as the comte de Chambord, and his sister joined her there. In 1848, Louis Philippe's reign ended in a revolution and, for the second time, France became a Republic.

Death
Marie-Thérèse died of pneumonia on 19 October 1851, three days after the fifty-eighth anniversary of the execution of her mother. She was buried next to her uncle/father-in-law, Charles X, and her husband, Louis XIX, in the crypt of the Franciscan monastery church of Castagnavizza in Görz, then in Austria, now Kostanjevica in the Slovenian city of Nova Gorica. Like her deceased uncle, Marie-Thérèse had remained a devout Roman Catholic.

Later, her nephew Henri, the comte de Chambord, last male of the senior line of the House of Bourbon; his wife, the comtesse de Chambord (formerly the Archduchess Marie-Thérèse of Austria-Este, daughter of Duke Francis IV of Modena and his wife, Princess Maria Beatrice of Savoy); and the comte's only sister, Louise, Duchess of Parma, were also laid to rest in the crypt in Görz. The famous antiquarian the Duke of Blacas was also buried there in honor of his dutiful years of service as a minister to Louis XVIII and Charles X.

Marie-Thérèse is described on her gravestone as the "Queen Dowager of France", a reference to her husband's 20 minute rule as King Louis XIX of France.

"Dark Countess" mystery
In October 2013, the grave of a woman in Hildburghausen, Thuringia, Germany, was exhumed to obtain DNA for testing, to determine if she was Marie-Thérèse. The woman, who gave her name as Sophie Botta, lived in a castle in the area from 1807 until her death in 1837, and never spoke in public, or was seen outside without her face being veiled. She was accompanied by Leonardus Cornelius van der Valck, a secretary in the Dutch embassy in Paris from July 1798 to April 1799, and together they were known as the Dark Counts. Van der Valck referred to Botta as 'Your Grace' and they only spoke to each other in French. Some German historians believe she was the real Marie-Thérèse, who had swapped places with her adoptive-sister, and possible half-sister, Ernestine Lambriquet, following the revolution. Possibly as she was too traumatised to resume a role in society, but also as a result of a pregnancy, after abuse by her captors, which was referred to in a letter from a family friend, at the Spanish Court, in 1795.

The DNA testing revealed that the Dark Countess was not Marie-Thérèse, but rather, another woman whose identity remains a mystery. On 28 July 2014 the 'Interessenkreis Dunkelgräfin' broadcast the results which proved beyond doubt that the Dunkelgräfin was not Marie-Thérèse, on television.

In fiction
Film

Marie-Thérèse has been portrayed in several motion picture adaptations, mainly to do with her mother's life.

In 1934, she was played, under the name Duchess d'Angoulême, by Gladys Cooper in The Iron Duke, opposite George Arliss as the Duke of Wellington.
In 1938, she was played by Marilyn Knowlden in Marie-Antoinette, opposite Norma Shearer as the queen.
In 1975, in the French television drama Marie-Antoinette, Marie-Thérèse was played by Anne-Laura Meury.
In 1989 she was played by Katherine Flynn in The French Revolution. Katherine's on-screen mother, Marie Antoinette, was played by her real mother, Jane Seymour.
In 2001, Daisy Bevan played Marie-Thérèse briefly in the costume-drama The Affair of the Necklace opposite her mother Joely Richardson as Marie Antoinette.
In 2006, Marie Antoinette, directed by Sofia Coppola, was released. Marie-Thérèse was played by two different child actresses. At age two, she was played by Lauriane Mascaro, and at age six she was played by Florrie Betts. Kirsten Dunst starred as her mother, Marie Antoinette.

Theatre and literature
She has also been portrayed in the following:

 All Those Who Suffered; a Northern Irish play on the mystery of Louis XVII.Madame Royale, a novel by Elena Maria Vidal, based on Marie-Thérèse's life.The Dark Tower, a novel by Sharon Stewart, based on The Journal of Madame Royale, which were the writings of Marie-Thérèse.  The novel was later re-released as part of the Beneath the Crown series under the title The Princess in the Tower.The Lacemaker and the Princess (2007), a children's novel by Kimberly Brubaker Bradley.Faces of the Dead by Suzanne Weyn (2014) .Hungry Marie (2017), a manga by Ryuhei Tamura.When Blood Lies by C.S. Harris (2022) .

Ancestry

Marie-Thérèse was a descendant of the Holy Roman Emperors through her mother, Archduchess Marie Antoinette of Austria, who was a daughter of Empress Maria Theresa I, Holy Roman Empress; the empress wanted all of her eldest granddaughters to be named after her.

References and notes

Further reading
 Castelot, André, Madame Royale, Librairie Académique Perrin, Paris, 1962, .
 Desmond, Alice Curtis. Marie Antoinette's Daughter . NY: Dodd, Mead & Company, 1967. .
 Lenotre, G., La fille de Louis XVI, Marie-Thérèse-Charlotte de France, duchesse d'Angoulême, in Mémoires et Souvenirs sur la Révolution et l'Empire, Librairie Académique Perrin, 1908.
 Nagel, Susan. Marie-Therese, Child of Terror: The Fate of Marie Antoinette's Daughter'''. NY: Bloomsbury, 2008. .

External links

Primary sources
  Duchess of Angoulême's Memoirs on the Captivity in the Temple (from the autograph manuscript)
 Duchess of Angoulême's Memoir on the Flight to Varennes (1823 English translation, by John Wilson Croker, of a slightly redacted French edition)
 Duchess of Angoulême's Memoirs on the Captivity in the Temple (same 1823 English translation)
 The Ruin of a Princess as told by the Duchesse d'Angoulême, Madame Elisabeth, Sister of Louis XVI, and Cléry, the King's Valet de Chambre, translated by Katharine Prescott Wormeley. New York: The Lamb Publishing Co., 1912 at A Celebration of Women Writers

Other material
 
 English language site of the franciscan Monastery in Kostanjevica , 
 English and German language site about the substitution theory of Madame Royale and the "Dark Countess of Hildburghausen"
 The Ruin of a Princess, which contains the life and letters of Madame Élisabeth, Journal of the Tower of the Temple by Cléry and Narrative of Madame Royale.

|-

|-

|-

1778 births
1851 deaths
French queens consort
Dauphines of France
Princesses of France (Bourbon)
Grand Crosses of the Order of Saint Louis
Recipients of the Order of Military Merit (France)
People from Versailles
French Roman Catholics
Burials at Kostanjevica Monastery
French people of Austrian descent
Deaths from pneumonia in Austria
Children of Louis XVI
Daughters of kings